Joe M. Turner (born November 23, 1969) is an American corporate magician, mentalist, and a frequent keynote speaker at conferences and other meetings. Based in Atlanta, he is in the field of corporate magic as well as customizing magic performances, keynotes, and seminars for trade shows, product launches, and other marketing efforts, conferences, or corporate events. He frequently incorporates sleight-of-hand, escape magic and mentalism into keynote addresses as a motivational speaker for corporate and private groups, speaking on topics of customer experience, brand engagement, memory training, change management, and creativity. He was one of only six performers selected to represent various aspects of the magic industry on the CNN Headline News feature "A Day of Magic," and also appeared on network television programs in Europe and South America.

Turner is best known within the magic industry as a columnist for Genii magazine and for serving as the 2015-2016 International President of the International Brotherhood of Magicians. He is the first native Mississippian and the first Georgia magician to perform in all three showrooms at the Magic Castle in Hollywood, California. He has appeared at Monday Night Magic in New York City and at the Dickens Parlor Theater at the Tropicana Atlantic City. He was voted Greater Atlanta Magician of the Year for 2000, 2010, and 2013, and FEA Atlanta Magician of the Year for 2009. His primary performance expertise is in the field of sleight-of-hand card magic, mentalism, and magic as a communication tool.

Turner and his wife have a daughter and a son, and live near Atlanta.

Early years
Joe Milton Turner was born in Jackson, Mississippi and grew up in nearby Brandon. His early years were marked with interest in magic, music, and acting. He was fascinated with the televised magic performances of Doug Henning and David Copperfield. He cites Johnny Carson, Dick Van Dyke, Red Skelton and Victor Borge as additional influences on his style.

Turner attended Mississippi State University where he was awarded one of the first Schillig Leadership Scholarships.  While a student at Mississippi State, Turner earned a 1989 summer undergraduate fellowship to study nuclear physics at Oak Ridge National Laboratory. He spent evenings in Oak Ridge as the pianist/music director at the local theater. During the summers of 1991 and 1992 he was awarded music direction and performance internships at Maine State Music Theatre. He later wrote and composed the stage musical BankNote$.  He had leading and supporting roles in numerous productions and was awarded Outstanding Performance by an Actor in 1991 and Outstanding Director in 1992. In 1991 he was named to the Mississippi State University Hall of Fame in recognition of his various academic, artistic, and leadership achievements.

Turner graduated summa cum laude in 1992 with a B.S. in physics/chemistry education, also completing significant additional coursework in astrophysics, music and theater. This crossover of interests and aptitudes has been a continuing theme in his work and in his ability to synthesize a variety of messages into cohesive presentations. He now serves on the selection committee for the Mississippi State University Distinguished Scholars program, which encompasses the original Schillig program plus other subsequently endowed scholarships.

Pre-magic career
Turner’s early career was in the field of management consulting. He began this career in 1993 with Andersen Consulting (now Accenture) in Atlanta, where he was promoted twice and became a manager in the firm’s change management practice. He left that position in 1998 to become a Vice President at Bank of America, working on similar human performance and communication issues within the Business Practices Integration division. He left the bank in 2000 to pursue a career as an entertainer and entrepreneur.

Corporate magic and speaking career
Turner’s first major project as a professional corporate magician was for The Coca-Cola Company. After a selection process that involved numerous professional magicians and magic consultants across the United States, Turner was engaged by CMI (a division of Clear Channel Entertainment), The Coca-Cola Company, and Reading is Fundamental to design, write, direct, and train performers to use magic in a project to promote literacy among school-age children.  This project, the Storytraveler Illusion Show, was tied to Coca-Cola’s sponsorship of Harry Potter and the Sorcerer’s Stone and other films in that series. Turner's magic consulting work on that project helped it to win a silver Reggie Award in the "Best Cause-Related Promotion" category from the Promotion Marketing Association in 2002.

Turner subsequently became a regular speaker and performer for The Coca-Cola Company at events at their Atlanta headquarters. He has also created customized magic at trade shows, meetings and conferences for a variety of clients such as Microsoft, InterContinental Hotel Group, Industrial Information Resources, Eton Corporation, American Water Works Association, the Possible Woman Conference, Alcoa, Pitney Bowes, the Atlanta Falcons, Biosound-Esaote, and American Honda Motor Company, as well as hundreds of other small and medium-sized companies and associations. He continues to appear at trade shows, conferences, corporate events, and public entertainment venues across the United States and internationally, billed with the title "Chief Impossibility Officer."

In addition to his corporate work, Turner starred in an ongoing one-man magic cabaret show in Atlanta's Buckhead district from 2005 through 2008. The show, Shenanigans, was presented at the Grand Hyatt Atlanta and was highlighted as a favorite by former Atlanta mayor Sam Massell.  Turner now tours the show to small theaters and other venues around the country. Since 2014, he has been a co-producer, star, and guest talent booker for Atlanta Magic Night.

As a motivational speaker, Turner combines his magic performance skills and change management experiences to create presentations on the "magical" results that can be achieved through focus and determination. He delivers magic-enhanced keynotes on customer experience, brand engagement, memory improvement, change management, and creative problem solving. He has been a guest speaker in college settings for both students and faculty.

Since 2001, Turner has written a product review column for Genii Magazine in which he evaluates new instructional materials for professional and amateur magicians. He contributed to the magic book Scripting Magic by Pete McCabe, and has been cited in numerous other works including Ken Weber's Maximum Entertainment.

Awards and honors
Turner was voted Greater Atlanta Magician of the Year for 2000, 2010, and 2013. He was honored with the IBM Ring 9 President’s Award in 2002. He was named FEA Atlanta Magician of the Year 2009. He was the first performer ever to win both the Doyne Michie Award for Excellence in Close-Up Magic and the J.C. Doty Award for Excellence in Stage Magic. He remains the only Georgia magician ever to appear in all three major showrooms at the Magic Castle in Hollywood, California:  the Close-Up Gallery, the Parlor of Prestidigitation, and the Palace of Mystery. He also won numerous awards in competitions at local and regional magic conventions. He has frequently served as a judge for the finals of the International Brotherhood of Magicians international stage magic and close-up magic competitions.

Turner served as the 2015-2016 International President  of the International Brotherhood of Magicians. He previously served as International President-Elect, International Vice President, Executive Committee member, and as Territorial Vice President for the state of Georgia. He served as the Executive Secretary of the Southeastern Association of Magicians from 2001-2002. He has also served as a Deputy Regional Vice President for Georgia for the Society of American Magicians.

In February 2010, Turner was elected a member of The Magic Circle in London, receiving the unusual and prestigious distinction of immediate advancement to the degree of Associate of the Inner Magic Circle (A.I.M.C.) with silver star.

References

External links
 Joe M. Turner - Official magic web site
 Joe M. Turner - Official keynote speaking web site
 Genii Magazine
 Performance and interview on "This Is Atlanta" - WPBA Channel 30

1969 births
Living people
Accenture people
American magicians
Mentalists
American motivational speakers
People from Jackson, Mississippi
People from Brandon, Mississippi
Mississippi State University alumni